Colour by Numbers is the second album by the British new wave group Culture Club, released in October 1983. Preceded by the hit single "Karma Chameleon", which reached number one in several countries, the album reached number one in the UK and has sold 10 million copies worldwide. It has been certified triple platinum in the UK and quadruple platinum in the US. It was ranked number 96 on Rolling Stone magazine's list of the 100 Best Albums of the 1980s.

Overview
Colour by Numbers has sold more than 10 million copies worldwide, and like its predecessor, Kissing to Be Clever, contains several hit singles.  In the United States, all the album tracks peaked at number three on the US Dance Club Songs chart. "Karma Chameleon" was the signature track from the album and when released as single reached number one in many countries.  "Church of the Poison Mind" reached number two in the UK, and went top 10 in the US, Canada, Australia and many European countries.  "Miss Me Blind" was released in North America, South America, Japan, and Australia to great success (top five in the US and Canada), "It's A Miracle" became a top 10 or top 20 hit in several markets. "Victims" was released in Europe and Oceania, it was also a top five hit in the UK and Australia, but was not released as a single in the US. "Mister Man" was also released as a single in South Africa.

The album was certified triple Platinum in the UK, Diamond in Canada, and 4× Platinum in the United States where it peaked at number two for six consecutive weeks behind Michael Jackson's Thriller.

In an interview in 1998, the four members of Culture Club agreed that Colour by Numbers was their best work. It was remastered in 2002 and 2003, for the Culture Club box set and for a re-release of the album. In 2005, the album was also released in Japan in a cardboard sleeve, similar to the original vinyl artwork, also featuring the remastered tracks and five bonus songs that were on the 2003 version.

In 2014 Boy George curated a live performance of Colour by Numbers in Manchester in collaboration with the BBC Philharmonic Orchestra.   Songs were performed by Boy George and guest artists Jimmy Somerville, Eve Gallagher, John Grant, Zee Asha, Hollie Cooke and the Melodico Ensemble.

Reception

Reviews for Colour by Numbers have been generally positive. Smash Hits reviewer Peter Martin called it "simply one of the most enjoyable records I've ever heard." Stephen Holden of Rolling Stone said that the album "secures lead singer Boy George's place as a blue-eyed soul balladeer in the first rank." Holden found that it "is by no means a weighty album", but nonetheless "has gobs of emotion plastered as thickly as Boy George's makeup, and ten tunes that stick", and concluded: "Whether you like the band or not, Culture Club is one pop group that matters." Robert Christgau of The Village Voice wrote that "George's warm, well-meaning, slightly clumsy croon signifies most effectively when it has the least to say – when it's most purely a medium for his warm, well-meaning, slightly clumsy self", and that "his real aim in life is to reenact the story of the ugly duckling – and to radiate the kind of extreme tolerance that's so often engendered by extreme sexual ambiguity." Colour by Numbers was ranked at number seven among the "Albums of the Year" for 1983 by NME.

In a retrospective review, AllMusic's Jose F. Promis wrote: "The songs were infectious, the videos were all over MTV, and the band was a media magnet." He deemed the album "flamboyant, fun, sexy, soulful, colorful, androgynous, and carefree" like other 1980s music, and concluded by calling it "the artistic and commercial pinnacle of a band that still attracted new fans years later." Scott Shetler of Slant Magazine stated that "Culture Club hit their stride, and the influence of its 10 colorful songs can still be felt today." He said that "its greatness can be measured by the fact that its album tracks are just as good as its singles", and that "in the end, Colour by Numbers is an album that needs no tinkering."

In 1989, Colour by Numbers was ranked at number 96 on Rolling Stones list of the 100 best albums of the 1980s. The album was included in the book 1001 Albums You Must Hear Before You Die.

Track listing
All tracks composed by O'Dowd/Moss/Craig/Hay, except "Karma Chameleon" and "It's a Miracle" composed by O'Dowd/Moss/Craig/Hay/Pickett.

Side one
 "Karma Chameleon" – 4:11
 "It's a Miracle" – 3:25
 "Black Money" – 5:19
 "Changing Every Day" – 3:17
 "That's the Way (I'm Only Trying to Help You)" – 2:45
Side two
 "Church of the Poison Mind" – 3:30
 "Miss Me Blind" – 4:30
 "Mister Man" – 3:36
 "Stormkeeper" – 2:46
 "Victims" – 4:55
2003 CD Bonus tracks

 "Man-Shake" – 2:34
 "Mystery Boy" (Suntori Hot Whiskey Song) – 3:33
 "Melting Pot" (live) – 4:31
 "Colour by Numbers" – 3:57
 "Romance Revisited" – 5:00

"Time (Clock of the Heart)" was included in Japanese vinyl pressings.

Personnel
Culture Club
 Boy George – lead and backing vocals
 Roy Hay – guitars, piano, electric sitar, backing vocals
 Mike Craig – bass guitar, backing vocals
 Jon Moss – drums, backing vocals
Additional musicians
 Judd Lander – harmonica
 Phil Pickett – Hammond organ, synthesizers
 Steve Grainger – saxophone
 Patrick Seymour – flute
 Graham Broad – percussion
 Jermaine Stewart – backing vocals
 Terry Bailey – trumpet
 Helen Terry – backing vocals

Charts

Weekly charts

Year-end charts

Decade-end charts

Certifications

Release details

References

External links

1983 albums
Culture Club albums
Virgin Records albums
Epic Records albums
Albums produced by Steve Levine